Patrick Timothy Walsh (6 May 1936 – 23 November 2007) was a New Zealand rugby union player and selector. He played 13 Tests and 14 other games for the All Blacks from 1955 to 1964. He also played for New Zealand Māori in 1955, 1956, 1958, 1959 1961, captaining the side on its 1958 tour to Australia, against the British Lions in 1959 and against the French in 1961. He was an All Black selector from 1969 to 1971.

References

New Zealand international rugby union players
Māori All Blacks players
1936 births
2007 deaths
People educated at Sacred Heart College, Auckland
Rugby union centres
Rugby union wings
Rugby union fullbacks
New Zealand rugby union players
Auckland rugby union players
Counties Manukau rugby union players
People from Kaitaia
Rugby union players from the Northland Region